Owrachi (also Romanized as Owrāchī and Ūrāchī; also known as Orāchī and Orchi) is a village in Qareh Poshtelu-e Bala Rural District, Qareh Poshtelu District, Zanjan County, Zanjan Province, Iran. At the 2006 census, its population was 40, in 12 families.

References 

Populated places in Zanjan County